is a Japanese actress, a former member of Takarazuka Revue, specializing in otokoyaku. She joined the revue in 1991, became the top star in 2002 and resigned from the company in 2007. She is from Komae, Tokyo, her birthday is December 15, 1972.

Her nicknames are Osa and Masa-chan (as called by Jun Sena), both are from her real name Masako Osada (長田雅子 Osada Masako).

She is the first otokoyaku of her class to reach the top (followed by classmate and former troupe-mate Hikaru Asami by 3 months).

Troupe History
 Flower Troupe: 1991–2007

General information

Following the examples of Mira Anju, Miki Maya and Mire Aika she became the top star of the troupe she had always been with, without any troupe transfer. (Although Hibiki Takumi had almost all her Takarazuka career in the Flower troupe, she had been in Senka for 2 years before she became the top star of the Troupe.) Also, another uniqueness of her career is that her status of being the second man was a short-lived one, because Hibiki Takumi became severely ill with myelitis during the Grand Theater performance.  Haruno took over the leading role for the Tokyo performance, and at that point she unofficially became the top star of the troupe. However, it is Elisabeth that is considered as her official top star début without top star overlap. With this production of Elisabeth, she is the first top star to perform as Der Tod as her début.

Considered as the traditional type of otokoyaku, she is praised as one of the best singers along with other legends like Asato Shizuki

She was one of the promising young stars promoted by the company in 1999, along with Jun Sena, the current top star for Moon Troupe; Hikaru Asami, the former top star for Snow Troupe; Kei Takashiro, the former top star for Cosmo Troupe; Kei Aran, the current top star for Star Troupe, Natsuki Mizu, the current top star for Snow Troupe and Yūga Yamato, the current top star for Cosmo Troupe.

She is the only top star who has three top star partners (Rei Ootori, Miyo Fuzuki and Ayane Sakurano), which is quite rare in an otokoyaku's case.

Even as a top star, she has maintained a good friendship with fellow stars (as well as former troupe-mates) such as Jun Sena, Hikaru Asami and Rira Maikaze.

In 2006, she had special appearance in the Snow production of Rose of Versailles, this was the first performance with classmate and former troupe mate Hikaru Asami since the troupe transfer for Asami in 1998, and was also the last given the resignation of latter.

She is the second star after Saki Asaji who has portrayed Der Tod from Elisabeth and Prince Rudolph from Mayerling, who was being attached to Der Tod in the previous musical.

She wanted to be a musumeyaku when she first entered Takarazuka. This story related to her classmate and legend Mari Hanafusa: when Haruno went for the entrance exam of Takarazuka Music School, she saw another beautiful girl (Hanafusa) and thought about being a musumeyaku beside this beautiful girl.

Notable Roles and Performances

New Actor Era

Black Jack - Cain
Kanashimi no Cordova - Vicente
How to Succeed in Business Without Really Trying - J. Pierrepont Finch (leading role shared with Hiromu Kiriya)
Hollywood Babylon - Arthur Cochran (her role in the formal performance is Peter Hunt)
That's Revue - Harukaze Taihei (her role in the formal performance is Matsumoto)

Regular Cast Era

Speakeasy - Bradley
Ludwig II - Richard Hornig
Asaki Yume Mishi - Genji Monogatari - Spirit of Time
Michelangelo - Rafaello Sanzio
Canary - Father Roblow
In the Amber-Hued Rain - Louis Valentin

Top Star Era

In the Amber-Hued Rain - Claude de Bernard (unofficial first leading role)
Growing Purple Flower - Prince Naka no Ōe (official first leading role)
Elisabeth - Der Tod (Grand Theater Top Star Debut)
Immortal Thorns - Eri Makropoulos and Errol Maxwell
A Flute Named Wind - Hanai Yoshio Mondonosho (with special appearance of Yū Todoroki)
Season of Angels - Gustave and King Pescatore
Java no Odoriko - Adinan
La Esperanza - Carlos
Hand Drum of Heaven, Nijihito
Marrakech: The Crimson Gravestone - Ludwig
Palermo Shines in the Setting Sun - Vittorio Rossi
Rose of Versailles: Maria Antonio and Fersen - Fersen
Rose of Versailles (Special Appearance for Snow Performance) - Andre
Apartment Cinema - Wolf
Phantom - Phantom/ErikMayerling - RudolphNotebook of Kogorou Akechi - The Black Lizard - Kogorou AkechiAsaki Yume Mishi - Genji Monogatari - Hikaru GenjiAdieu Marseille - Gerard (Last musical with Takarazuka)

Personal Concert

Metamorphosis
S (es)
I Got Music
Etude

After Takarazuka

2012: Elisabeth'' -  Elisabeth (2012 Toho production) 

2011: DREAM TRAIL ~Takarazuka Legends~ (OG Performance)

2010: Funny Girl

2009: Solo Concert:「男と女　Un homme et une femme」

2009: Marguerite

2008: Christmas Dinner Show: Celebration

2008: First Concert: My Heart

References 

1972 births
Living people
People from Komae, Tokyo
Japanese actresses
Takarazuka Revue
Takarazuka otokoyaku